Faster Than Fear (German: Schneller als die Angst) is a 2022 German TV series directed by Florian Baxmeyer. It’s based on an original idea from Klaus Arriens and Thomas Wilke who also wrote the scripts for all six episodes.

Plot
Sunny is a tough cop, but lately she hasn’t been quite herself. After a six-week absence, she is back on duty, right back on a hard case. André Haffner has escaped the prison and nobody knows how. He must have had help – on the inside and out. One thing is for sure: he will kill again – and his victims are women. Sunny is eager to take the lead, but her superiors give that to her colleague and send her to therapy. Sunny has a secret reason for her absence: she was assaulted and has no idea by whom. Even though her male colleagues and her partner Alex support her, she doesn't trust them fully. Suspicion has become her second nature and when Sunny finds out who may have attacked her, she wages a proxy war with the hunt for Haffner, revealing more parallels between them than she would like.

Cast
 Friederike Becht: Sonja "Sunny" Becker
 Christoph Letkowski: Markus Fechner
 Felix Klare: André Haffner
 Andreas Döhler: Torsten Wächter
 Thomas Loibl: Ralf Keller
 Oleg Tikhomirov: Jakub "Kuba" Kasakow       
 Lisa Hrdina: Johanna Delling
 Golo Euler: Alex Reuter
 Stephanie Japp: Julia Keller
 Carina Wiese: Barbara Zellmann
 Sarah Bauerett: Nora Belling
 Hannah Ehrlichmann: Tina Kullmann
 Anton Weil: Steffen Heuss
 Steffen Münster: Babsy
 Hilke Altefrohne: Eva Bergedorf
 Fred Costea: Patient
 Robert Maaser: Daniel Bayer
 Jasmin Bartels: Jennifer Bayer
 Anton Dreger: Tim Gebhardt
 Anni Nagel: Pia Jenrich
 Paul Kupetz: Kollege

Production
The first season was shot between August 4, 2020, and October 30, 2020, in Magdeburg and Berlin.

The series was broadcast in double episodes on January 1, January 2, and January 9, 2022 on Das Erste in late prime. It was first published on the streaming platform of ARD on December 30, 2021.

Reception
Faster Than Fear got positive reviews overall. Joachim Huber for Tagesspiegel mentioned that the series is "a must for an every series fan". He praised the crew and the entire ensemble for celebrating the art of television through the series.

The Weser-Kurier enjoys the complex characters who are exposed layer by layer over the course of the script.

The Frankfurter Allgemeine Zeitung on the other hand, criticizes the introduction of the characters, but states that the series finally comes into its own in the second episode.

Tilmann P. Gangloff for Tittelbach.tv wrote that the twisty und exciting plot enfolds on two levels: the crumbling network of relationships on one hand and the cat-and-mouse-game-like hunt for serial killer on the other, which both escalate eventually.

References

External links 

2022 German television series debuts
2020s German television series
Das Erste original programming
German-language television shows